Tin Ping Estate is a public housing estate in Sheung Shui, New Territories, Hong Kong, near Sacred Hill and Tin Ping Shan Tsuen. It is the northernmost mixed public and TPS housing estate in Sheung Shui Town and consists of seven residential buildings completed between 1986 and 1990. Some of the flats were sold to tenants through Tenants Purchase Scheme Phase 3 in 2000.

On Shing Court is a Home Ownership Scheme court in Sheung Shui, near Tin Ping Estate. It has only one block built in 1990.

Houses

Tin Ping Estate

On Shing Court

Demographics
According to the 2016 by-census, Tin Ping Estate had a population of 17,625. The median age was 51.6 and the majority of residents (99.1 per cent) were of Chinese ethnicity. The average household size was 2.9 people. The median monthly household income of all households (i.e. including both economically active and inactive households) was HK$24,170.

Politics
For the 2019 District Council election, the estate fell within two constituencies. Most of the estate is located in the Tin Ping West constituency, which is represented by Kwok Long-fung, while the remainder of the estate and On Shing Court fall within the Tin Ping East constituency, which was formerly represented by Lau Ki-fung until July 2021.

Covid Pandemic
Tin Hee House of Tin Ping Estate was placed under lockdown on 23 February, 2022.

See also

Public housing estates in Sheung Shui

References

Sheung Shui
Public housing estates in Hong Kong
Tenants Purchase Scheme
Housing estates with centralized LPG system in Hong Kong